Pebble Township may refer to one of the following places in the United States:

 Pebble Township, Dodge County, Nebraska
 Pebble Township, Pike County, Ohio

Township name disambiguation pages